Foster care in the modern sense was first introduced in the United Kingdom in 1853 when Reverend John Armistead removed children from a workhouse in Cheshire, and placed them with foster families. The local council (called unions at the time) was legally responsible for the children, and paid the foster parents a sum equal to the cost of maintaining the child in the workhouse.

According to the Children and Family Court Advisory and Support Service – the agency for England and Wales set up to safeguard and promote the welfare of children involved in family court proceedings – the total number of new care applications between April 2011 and March 2012 was up by 10.8 per cent, rising from 9,202 over the same period the previous year, exceeding the 2008-09 tally of 6,488 by 57.2 per cent.

Recent controversies

Proceedings to place children in foster care have increased since 2007 in Britain. The death of 17-month-old Peter Connelly, known as "Baby P", a 17-month-old British boy who died in London after suffering more than 50 injuries over an eight-month period during which he was seen many times by Haringey Children's services and National Health Service health professionals, led to widespread public reaction. Care applications surpassed the 10,000 yearly mark in England for the first time in 2012. For the year to 31 March 2015, the number had risen to 12,791, an increase of 15% on the previous year.

In Nottinghamshire County in the UK an ex-foster father was convicted in 2010 of raping and sexually abusing vulnerable boys for more than a decade.

References 

 
Child welfare in the United Kingdom